The ashrafi (Arabic: اشرفی ) is a gold coin which originated from Mamluk Egypt, and which was later widely copied in regions under Muslim rule in the Middle East, Central Asia, and South Asia. The coin was first minted in 1407 and was named after al-Ashraf Sayf ad-Dīn Barsbāy (d. 1438), one of the Mamluk rulers of Egypt. It originally weighed 3.45 grams.

See also
 Mohur

Source

External links
 Gold Ashrafi coin, struck during the reign of Suleiman the Magnificent (Archive Link)

Coins
Gold coins
Numismatics
Early Modern currencies